Alessandro Lombardi (born 21 January 2000) is an Italian professional footballer who plays as a midfielder for  club Reggina.

Club career
Born in Rivoli, Lombardi started his career in Juventus youth sector. In 2018 he moved to Cagliari Primavera.

On 7 September 2020, he joined to Serie C club Imolese. Lombardi made his professional debut on 27 September 2020 against Calcio Padova.

On 19 July 2022 he joined Serie B side Reggina.

References

External links
 
 

2000 births
Living people
People from Rivoli, Piedmont
Footballers from Piedmont
Italian footballers
Association football midfielders
Serie C players
Juventus F.C. players
Cagliari Calcio players
Imolese Calcio 1919 players
Reggina 1914 players
Sportspeople from the Metropolitan City of Turin